Per Kjellin (born 9 May 1960) is a Swedish judoka. He competed in the men's half-middleweight event at the 1984 Summer Olympics.

References

External links
 

1960 births
Living people
Swedish male judoka
Olympic judoka of Sweden
Judoka at the 1984 Summer Olympics
People from Borås
Sportspeople from Västra Götaland County
20th-century Swedish people